No End may refer to:

No End (album), 2013 album by Keith Jarrett
No End (film), 1985 film directed by Krzysztof Kieślowski
"Tiada Akhir" (Malay for "No End"), song by Yuna from Rouge